Richard Thomas Hanna (June 9, 1914 – June 9, 2001) was a U.S. Representative from California. He became involved in a scandal dubbed Koreagate by accepting bribes from a businessman working for the South Korean government.  He was found guilty, resigned his seat, and served one year in prison.

History
Hanna was born in Kemmerer, Wyoming and graduated from Pasadena Junior College, Pasadena, California. He received his BA and LLB from the University of California, Los Angeles and then became a lawyer in private practice, after serving in the United States Naval Air Corps from 1942 to 1945.

Career
Hanna served in the California State Assembly from 1956 to 1963. He was elected as a Democrat to the Eighty-eighth United States Congress in 1962 and to the five succeeding Congresses (January 3, 1963 - December 31, 1974) to represent California's 34th congressional district, which then covered parts of Los Angeles and Orange counties.

Koreagate
In the 1970s, he received payments of about $200,000 from Korean businessman Tongsun Park in what became known as the Koreagate influence buying scandal. After the payments were revealed, he pleaded guilty to conspiring to commit bribery and was sentenced to 6–30 months in federal prison, of which he served one year.

Death
After his death on his 87th birthday, June 9, 2001, in Tryon, North Carolina, he was cremated and his ashes were scattered in the Atlantic Ocean, off the coast of North Carolina.

See also
List of American federal politicians convicted of crimes
List of federal political scandals in the United States

References

External links
 Political Graveyard website
 Join California Richard T. Hanna

1914 births
2001 deaths
20th-century American politicians
California politicians convicted of crimes
Democratic Party members of the United States House of Representatives from California
Democratic Party members of the California State Assembly
People from Kemmerer, Wyoming
People from Tryon, North Carolina
Politicians convicted of conspiracy to defraud the United States
UCLA School of Law alumni
United States Navy personnel of World War II
University of California, Los Angeles alumni